Lacandon (Jach-tʼaan in the revised orthography of the Instituto Nacional de Lenguas Indigenas) is a Mayan language spoken by all of the 1,000 Lacandon people in the state of Chiapas in Mexico. Within Chiapas, Lacandon is spoken in Betel, Lacanjá San Quintín, Lake Metzaboc, Metzaboc, and Najá.

Native Lacandon speakers refer to their language as Jach tʼaan or Hach tʼan. Most Lacandon people speak Lacandon Maya. Most also speak Spanish.

Phonology
The following tables list the standard phonemes of the Lacandon language.

Consonants

References

Articles in class projects/Rutgers
Agglutinative languages
Mayan languages
Indigenous languages of Mexico
Indigenous languages of Central America
Mesoamerican languages